Absolute Classic Masterpieces is the third compilation album by English alternative rock band Felt, released in 1992. It collects tracks from the band's singles and albums recorded for Cherry Red between 1981 and 1985, with two exceptions: "Dance of Deliverance" from guitarist Maurice Deebank's album, Inner Thought Zone; and "Index", a single recorded and released by leader Lawrence before the band formed properly. Tracks 4, 9, 11, 15 and 18 are instrumental.

The liner notes for the album feature an interview with Felt's original bass player, Nick Gilbert, reflecting on the formation of the band.

"Sunlight Bathed the Golden Glow" as it appears here is the version from the band's third album, and is different from the single. The version of "Fortune" here is a re-recording of the song from their first album.

Track listing

Personnel
Lawrence – vocals, guitar
Maurice Deebank – guitar, bass
Martin Duffy – keyboards
Gary Ainge – drums, bongos
Marco Thomas – bass
Mick Lloyd – bass
Nick Gilbert – bass
Elizabeth Fraser – vocals
Da'ave Elson – bass
John Rivers – keyboard, synth bass
Tony Race – drums

References 

Felt (band) albums
Cherry Red Records albums